Girolamo Tessari (c. 1480 – c. 1561), also called Gerolamo Tessari or Girolamo dal Santo, was an Italian painter, active in a Renaissance style in his native city of Padua.

Biography
He painted a canvas depicting the Deposition found at the Museo Civico of Padua. Among his many works in Padua are a number of fresco decorations, including frescoes at the Scuola and Antisacristy of the Basilica of Sant'Antonio da Padova; in the apse of the Church of Santa Maria in Vanzo (painted circa 1520); at the chapel of Santa Maria in the church of San Francesco, at the Scuoletta del Carmine; at the Oratory of the Confraternita del Redentore; in the Chapter Hall of the Abbey of Praglia; and in the main cloister and church of the Abbey of Santa Giustina.

References

Italian Renaissance painters
15th-century Italian painters
Italian male painters
16th-century Italian painters
Painters from Padua
Year of death unknown
Year of birth unknown
Year of birth uncertain